Hugh Michael Horace Dancy (born 19 June 1975) is an English actor who rose to prominence for his role as the titular character in the television film adaptation of David Copperfield (2000) as well as for roles in feature films as Kurt Schmid in Black Hawk Down (2001) and Prince Charmont in Ella Enchanted (2004). Other film roles include Joe Conner in Shooting Dogs (2005), Grigg Harris in The Jane Austen Book Club (2007), Luke Brandon in Confessions of a Shopaholic (2009), Adam Raki in Adam (2009) and Ted in Martha Marcy May Marlene (2011). On television, he portrayed criminal profiler Will Graham in the NBC television series Hannibal (2013–2015), Cal Roberts in the Hulu original series The Path (2016–2018) and Robert Devereux, 2nd Earl of Essex, in the Channel 4 miniseries Elizabeth I (2005); the latter role earned him a Primetime Emmy Award nomination. Dancy currently portrays Senior Assistant District Attorney Nolan Price on NBC's revival of the original Law & Order (2022–present).

Early life
Dancy was born in Stoke-on-Trent, Staffordshire, and raised in Newcastle-under-Lyme. His mother, Sarah Ann Dancy (née Birley, born 1952), works in academic publishing. His father is philosophy professor Jonathan Dancy (born 1946), who teaches at the University of Reading and at the University of Texas at Austin.

Hugh is the oldest of three children, followed by brother Jack Dancy (born 1977), who is co-director of the travel company Trufflepig Travel, and sister Katharine Sarah Redman (née Dancy, born 1980). From the age of 5 to the age of 10, Dancy was educated at Edenhurst Preparatory School in Newcastle-under-Lyme. At age 10, Dancy attended boarding school at the Dragon School in Oxford, then, at 13 at Winchester College. At age 18, he acted in the Winchester College Players production of Twelfth Night, which was performed in both Winchester and at the Minack Theatre in Cornwall. He went on to study English at St Peter's College, Oxford.

Career
After graduation, Dancy moved to London, where a chance conversation in a cafe led to his meeting casting director Ros Hubbard and agent Dallas Smith, who signed him. In 1999, Dancy appeared in the second series of Cold Feet in the role of Danny, who had a fleeting romance with Rachel, one of the show's main characters. In 2002, Dancy played Daniel Deronda in the BBC's adaptation of George Eliot's novel Daniel Deronda.

Notable roles from film include Dancy's Prince Charmont from the 2004 Disney film Ella Enchanted alongside Anne Hathaway and, from the same year, Galahad in King Arthur alongside later Hannibal co-star Mads Mikkelsen. In 2005, he starred as Adam Raki in Adam, an independent film which premiered at the Sundance Film Festival in 2009 and follows the story of a young man with an autism spectrum disorder. He went on to appear in various other films.

In theatre, Dancy has appeared in MCC Theater's The Pride, written by Alexi Kaye Campbell, at the Lucille Lortel Theatre in New York City. The off-Broadway production was directed by Joe Mantello and co-starred Ben Whishaw and Andrea Riseborough. In 2007, Dancy had a starring role on Broadway as Captain Dennis Stanhope in Journey's End (Belasco Theatre). From 2010 until 2011, he starred in Manhattan Theatre Club's Broadway production of Venus in Fur alongside Nina Arianda. His performance was praised by The New York Times theatre critic Charles Isherwood. In August 2018, it was announced he would appear with Stockard Channing in Roundabout Theatre Company's off-Broadway premiere of Apologia, written by Alexi Kay Campbell, in the dual roles of Peter and Simon.

In March 2012, NBC announced that Dancy had been cast as Will Graham in Hannibal, the television adaptation based on the main character of Thomas Harris' 1981 novel Red Dragon. The show received critical acclaim and was nominated for numerous awards. It was cancelled after three seasons and concluded in 2015, though there are hopes for its revival. From 2016 to 2018, he appeared for three seasons as Cal Roberts, a lead character in Hulu's The Path, alongside Aaron Paul and Michelle Monaghan. In November 2021 Dancy was announced as one of the leads in NBC's 2022 revival of Law & Order, playing an assistant district attorney.

Personal life
Dancy met American actress Claire Danes on the set of Evening in Newport, Rhode Island, and they began dating. In February 2009, they announced their engagement. The couple married in France in 2009 in a private ceremony. They have two children together, born in 2012 and 2018.

They live in the West Village neighbourhood of New York City.

Filmography

Film

Television

Theatre

Awards and nominations

References

External links

 

1975 births
Living people
Alumni of St Peter's College, Oxford
English male film actors
English male models
English male stage actors
English male television actors
People educated at The Dragon School
People educated at Winchester College
People from Stoke-on-Trent
People from Greenwich Village
20th-century English male actors
21st-century English male actors
British expatriate male actors in the United States
Actors from Staffordshire